Günther Knauss (14 February 1943 – 6 February 2022) was a German ice hockey player. He competed in the men's tournament at the 1968 Winter Olympics. Knauss died in Füssen, Bavaria on 6 February 2022, at the age of 78.

References

External links
 

1943 births
2022 deaths
German ice hockey players
Ice hockey players at the 1968 Winter Olympics
Olympic ice hockey players of West Germany
Sportspeople from Füssen